Lauren Elizabeth Bowles is an American actress. Bowles was born in Washington, D.C., to Judith (née LeFever) and L. Thompson Bowles. Her half-sister (on her mother's side) is actress Julia Louis-Dreyfus.

Background
She majored in drama at New York University.

Bowles has appeared in numerous TV shows, including Arrested Development, CSI: Crime Scene Investigation, Judging Amy and Private Practice. She has appeared with Louis-Dreyfus in programs such as Seinfeld, as a waitress at the diner; The New Adventures of Old Christine, Watching Ellie, and Veep. She has also appeared in some feature films. In April 2010, she was cast as Holly Cleary, a Wiccan, in the vampire television series True Blood.

She currently appears on XM radio's Take Five channel, where she does features for their Five Minute Magazine.

Personal life
In 2004 Bowles married actor Patrick Fischler, whom she met in college. Their daughter, Fia Lucille Fischler, was born in April 2009.

Filmography

Film

Television

References

External links 

Living people
American film actresses
American television actresses
Place of birth missing (living people)
20th-century American actresses
21st-century American actresses
American radio personalities
Tisch School of the Arts alumni
Actresses from Washington, D.C.
Year of birth missing (living people)